The play-offs of the 2019 UEFA European Under-21 Championship qualifying competition involve the four runners-up with the best records among all nine groups in the qualifying group stage.

Ranking of second-placed teams

Draw

The draw for the play-offs was held on 19 October 2018, 13:00 CEST, at the UEFA headquarters in Nyon, Switzerland. The four teams were drawn into two ties of home-and-away two-legged format.

Matches

The two play-off winners qualify for the final tournament.
All times are CET (UTC+1), as listed by UEFA (local times, if different, are in parentheses).

|}

Austria won 2–0 on aggregate.

Poland won 3–2 on aggregate.

Goalscorers

References

External links
Fixtures at UEFA.com

Play-offs
UEFA European Under-21 Championship qualification play-offs
UEFA European Under-21 Championship qualification play-offs